Zehra Duman (born 1993) is an Australian-born Turkish woman who traveled to Daesh territory where she married a jihadi fighter. Born in Melbourne, Duman is reported to have been a friend of Tara Nettleton and Khaled Sharrouf, who travelled from Australia to Daesh territory, with their five children, in 2014. Duman's online recruiting activities have been the subject of scholarly attention.

Duman married an Australian jihadist named Mahmoud Abdullatif, who was killed in action five weeks after their marriage.

Duman was described as an active recruiter of volunteers, who taunted Australian authorities to "catch me if you can".  In "Fatal Attraction: Western Muslimas and ISIS", Anita Perešin identified Duman as a female jihad supporter who claimed to want to personally undertake suicide mission or engage in combat.

Provocative photos Duman tweeted, of herself and four other women, clad head to toe in black, holding AK-47 rifles, and posing over an expensive sports car, have been widely republished.

In February 2019, the Australian Broadcasting Corporation obtained a video of Duman, where she described herself as the best friend of late Tara Nettleton, who died in 2015.  In the video she said that Nettleton's three surviving children, Zaynab Sharrouf, Hoda Sharrouf and Hamzah Sharrouf, remained in the Daesh-occupied territory, but that they were "fine", the last time she saw them.

On February 28, 2019, Dateline interviewed Duman's mother, who had recently heard from Duman. Duman's mother told Naima Brown of Dateline that, by 2017, Duman had grown disenchanted with Daesh, and wanted to come home to Australia, but could not because of Daesh's intense scrutiny of those living in its territory.

On March 14, 2019, the Australian Broadcasting Corporation reported that an Australian woman who declined to identify herself, but who was believed to be Duman, was staying in the al Hawl refugee camp, trying to return to Australia with her two children.  She described a terrible shortage of food, and she feared her six-month-old daughter would starve to death. On October 7, 2019, Duman's Australian citizenship was revoked.

The New Daily reported that Duman, and other Australian citizens, were quietly whisked from the Al Hawl camp, in mid 2019.  The Australian citizens were hooded, so they would not know where they were. They reported that the other Australians were taken to Iraq, where they met with Australian officials, while Duman was detained in an unknown location. There was speculation that she was removed for her own protection as the most devout followers of the ISIS philosophy in the camp disapproved of signs she had abandoned radicalism. In particular, she had stopped covering her head with any kind of scarf, and had taken up smoking cigarettes. She was returned to the camp without any explanation.

In December 2019, the Herald-Sun cited Duman as an example, when it quoted an American official who called on US allies, like Australia, to repatriate their citizens instead of stripping them of citizenship.  The official argued that stripping citizens of citizenship can backfire, and trigger them to acts of violence.

In February 2020, The Australian discussed what was known about the citizenship of Duman's two children, who were born in Daesh controlled Syria.  It questioned whether these children, who had Australian grandparents, should be denied Australian citizenship because their mother had been stripped of citizenship.

The Guardian reported that Duman and her children were still in the Al Hawl refugee camp, in June 2020. Duman was reported to have mounted a challenge over the legality of the law that stripped her of Australian citizenship.

References 

Turkish expatriates in Syria
Turkish Islamists
Islamic State of Iraq and the Levant members from Australia
People who lost Australian citizenship